Marigold is  an English name taken from the common name used for flowers from different genuses such as Calendula or Tagetes, among others. 

The flower name is derived from Mary’s gold and was used in reference to the Virgin Mary.   Marigolds are often incorporated into “Mary gardens” that are planted with flowers associated with Mary.

The name came into use along with other flower and plant names that became popular for girls in English-speaking countries in the 1800s and early 1900s.   It has recently increased in usage in part due to a child character on the popular TV series Downton Abbey. In 2021, 247 newborn American girls were given the name, a greater number than in any prior year.

Notable people
Marigold Churchill (1918-1921), daughter of Winston Churchill
Marigold Linton (born 1936), American cognitive psychologist and member of the Morongo Band of Cahuilla Mission Indians
Marigold “Goldie” Semple (1952-2009), Canadian actress
Marigold Southey, born 1928, Australian philanthropist who served as Lieutenant-Governor of Victoria from 2001 to 2006.

Notes 

English feminine given names
Given names derived from plants or flowers